Bradley Mazikou (born 2 June 1996) is a professional footballer who plays as a left-back for Super League Greece club Aris. Born in France, he represents Congo at international level.

Club career
Mazikou began his senior career with Lorient but was unable to break into the first-team. He managed just one appearance, playing full 90 minutes in a 3–2 away loss against Stade Rennais in the Coupe de la Ligue on 26 October 2016.

Mazikou played two seasons regularly for Lorient B and spent time on loan at Dunkerque and Cholet in the Championnat National, before joining Bulgarian club CSKA Sofia on a three years deal.

Bradley Mazikou joined CSKA Sofia for an undisclosed fee on 20 August 2019.

Aris
On 5 July 2022, Mazikou signed a three-year contract with Aris.

International career
Born in France, Mazikou is of Brazzaville-Congolese descent. Mazikou debuted for the Republic of the Congo national team in a 2–0 2021 Africa Cup of Nations qualification win over Eswatini on 12 November 2020.

Career statistics

Club

International

Honours
CSKA Sofia
 Bulgarian Cup: 2021

References

External links
 

1996 births
Living people
Sportspeople from Orléans
Republic of the Congo footballers
Association football defenders
Republic of the Congo international footballers
French footballers
French expatriate sportspeople in Bulgaria
French expatriate sportspeople in Greece
French sportspeople of Republic of the Congo descent
FC Lorient players
USL Dunkerque players
SO Cholet players
PFC CSKA Sofia players
Aris Thessaloniki F.C. players
Championnat National players
First Professional Football League (Bulgaria) players
Super League Greece players
Republic of the Congo expatriate footballers
Republic of the Congo expatriate sportspeople in Bulgaria
Republic of the Congo expatriate sportspeople in Greece
Expatriate footballers in Bulgaria
Expatriate footballers in Greece
Black French sportspeople